In mathematics, an LB-space, also written (LB)-space, is a topological vector space  that is a locally convex inductive limit of a countable inductive system  of Banach spaces. 
This means that  is a direct limit of a direct system  in the category of locally convex topological vector spaces and each  is a Banach space.

If each of the bonding maps  is an embedding of TVSs then the LB-space is called a strict LB-space.
Some authors (e.g. Schaefer) define the term "LB-space" to mean "strict LB-space," so when reading mathematical literature, its recommended to always check how LB-space is defined.

Definition 

Properties 

A strict LB-space is complete, barrelled, and bornological (and thus ultrabornological).

Examples 

Final topology on the direct limit of finite-dimensional Euclidean spaces

Let 

For every natural number  let  denote the usual Euclidean space endowed with the Euclidean topology and let  denote the canonical inclusion defined by  so that its image is

and consequently,
 

Endow the set  with the final topology  induced by the family  of all canonical inclusions. 
With this topology,  becomes a complete Hausdorff locally convex sequential topological vector space that is  a Fréchet–Urysohn space. 
Endow the image  with the final topology induced on it by the bijection  that is, it is endowed with the Euclidean topology transferred to it from  via  
A subset  is open (resp. closed) in  if and only if for every  the set  is an open (resp. closed) subset of  
The topology  is coherent with family of subspaces  
This makes  into an LB-space. 

Under this identification,  becomes a direct limit of the direct system  where for every  the map  is the canonical inclusion defined by  where there are  trailing zeros.

Counter-examples 

There exists a bornological LB-space whose strong bidual is  bornological.  
There exists an LB-space that is not quasi-complete.

See also

Citations

References 

  
  
  
  
  
  
  
  
  
  
  
  
  
  
  
  
  

Topological vector spaces